Nelson Ojeda is a Chilean Anglican bishop. He was consecrated as an auxiliary Bishop of Chile in 2016, and continued in that role after the diocese was formed into an autonomous ecclesiastical province in 2018.

References

21st-century Anglican bishops in South America
Living people
Year of birth missing (living people)
Anglican bishops of Chile